is a monorail train station on the Chiba Urban Monorail located in Wakaba-ku in the city of Chiba, Chiba Prefecture, Japan. It is the terminal station for Line 2 of the Chiba Urban Monorail and is located 12.0 kilometers from the northern terminus at Chiba Station.

History
Chishirodai Station was opened on March 28, 1988.

Lines
Chiba Urban Monorail
Line 2

Layout
Chishirodai Station is an elevated station with two opposed side platforms serving two tracks. Platform 1 is in use only during rush periods.

Platforms

External links

Chiba Urban Monorail home page 

Railway stations in Japan opened in 1988
Railway stations in Chiba Prefecture